Matt Pitman is an American public address announcer for the NBA’s Golden State Warriors. 
Pitman was a broadcaster with KIRO (AM) in Seattle, Washington. He has worked at KIRO covering all Seattle area sports, as well as serving on the pre and post game broadcasts of the Seattle Mariners radio network. Pitman has served as the KeyArena voice for the Sonics since the 2004-05 NBA season until the Sonics' relocation after the 2007-08 NBA season, replacing longtime announcer Jim Graci.  In May 2006, he was hired to be the arena voice for the Storm. In August 2019, he was hired to be the Warriors public address announcer at the Chase Center in San Francisco.

References

External links
 Pitman's hiring with Seattle SuperSonics

Major League Baseball broadcasters
Living people
American sports announcers
Seattle SuperSonics announcers
National Basketball Association public address announcers
Seattle Storm
Year of birth missing (living people)